There have been three baronetcies created for persons with the surname Kaye, one in the Baronetage of England and two in the Baronetage of the United Kingdom.

The Kaye baronetcy, of Woodesham in the County of York, was created in the Baronetage of England on 4 February 1642 for John Kaye, of Woodsome Hall, Almondbury, Yorkshire. He was a colonel of the Horse in the service of King Charles I during the Civil War. His title was forfeited by the Parliamentarians but restored after the return of the monarchy in 1660. The second and third Baronets represented Yorkshire in the House of Commons. The fourth Baronet represented York and served as Mayor of York. He was also a well-known Jacobite supporter. The fifth baronet was sheriff of Yorkshire in 1761. The title became extinct on the death in 1809 of the sixth Baronet, who was Dean of Lincoln .

The Kaye, later Lister-Kaye Baronetcy, of Grange in the County of York, was created in the Baronetage of the United Kingdom on 28 December 1812 for John Lister Kaye. He was the natural son and heir of the fifth Baronet of the 1642 creation. The second Baronet assumed the additional surname of Lister. The eighth Baronet is a writer on nature and environmental issues.

The Kaye Baronetcy, of Huddersfield in the County of York, was created in the Baronetage of the United Kingdom on 8 March 1923 for the textile manufacturer Joseph Kaye. He was a Senior Director of Kaye and Stewart Ltd, of Huddersfield, and a Director of the London, Midland and Scottish Railway and of Lloyds Bank.

Kaye baronets, of Woodesham (1642)

Sir John Kaye, 1st Baronet (1616–1662)
Sir John Kaye, 2nd Baronet (–1706)
Sir Arthur Kaye, 3rd Baronet (–1726)
Sir John Lister Kaye, 4th Baronet (1697–1752)
Sir John Lister Kaye, 5th Baronet (1725–1789)
Very Revd. Sir Richard Kaye, 6th Baronet (1736–1809)

Kaye, later Lister-Kaye baronets, of Grange (1812)
Sir John Lister Kaye, 1st Baronet (1772–1827)
Sir John Lister Lister-Kaye, 2nd Baronet (1801–1871)
Sir John Pepys Lister-Kaye, 3rd Baronet (1853–1924)
Sir Cecil Edmund Lister-Kaye, 4th Baronet (1854–1931)
Sir Kenelm Arthur Lister-Kaye, 5th Baronet (1892–1955)
Sir Lister Lister-Kaye, 6th Baronet (1873–1962)
Sir John Christopher Lister Lister-Kaye, 7th Baronet (1913–1982)
Sir John Philip Lister Lister-Kaye, 8th Baronet (born 1946)

The heir apparent to the baronetcy is John Warwick Noel Lister-Kaye (born 1974), only son of the 8th Baronet.

Kaye baronets, of Huddersfield (1923)
Sir Joseph Henry Kaye, 1st Baronet (1856–1923)
Sir Henry Gordon Kaye, 2nd Baronet (1889–1956)
Sir Stephen Henry Gordon Kaye, 3rd Baronet (1917–1983)
Sir David Alexander Gordon Kaye, 4th Baronet (1919–1994)
Sir Paul Henry Gordon Kaye, 5th Baronet (born 1958)

The heir presumptive to the baronetcy is John Egidio Gordon Kaye (born 1967), 2nd and youngest son of the 4th Baronet.

Notes

References
Kidd, Charles, Williamson, David (editors). Debrett's Peerage and Baronetage (1990 edition). New York: St Martin's Press, 1990, 

Baronetcies in the Baronetage of the United Kingdom
Extinct baronetcies in the Baronetage of England